Thomas Crilly (20 July 1895 – 18 January 1960) was an English professional footballer who played in The Football League for Hartlepools United, Derby County, Crystal Palace, Northampton Town. He also played for Stockton and Scunthorpe & Lindsey United.

Playing career
Crilly was born in Stockton-on-Tees, England and began his playing career with local team Stockton F.C., before signing for Hartlepools United (then playing in the North Eastern League) in 1919. He was ever present in his first two seasons and missed only one game when Hartlepools were elected to the Third Division North in 1921–22. In 1922, Crilly and teammate Harry Thoms moved, along with manager Cecil Potter, to Derby County. He made over 200 appearances, in total, for Derby and helped the club achieve promotion to the First Division, before moving to Crystal Palace in 1928 (again at the same time as Thoms). He was a regular in the sides that finished Third Division South runners up in 1929 and 1931. In 1933 he moved to Northampton Town, where he became club captain between then and 1935 when he moved to become player-manager of Scunthorpe & Lindsey United.

Later career
Crilly left Scunthorpe in 1937 and became a publican in Derby. He also assisted with coaching Derby County junior players during The Second World War.

Crilly died in Derby on 18 January 1960.

References

External links
Tommy Crilly Hartlepool Profile
Tom Crilly at holmesdale.net

English footballers
English Football League players
1895 births
1960 deaths
Derby County F.C. players
Scunthorpe United F.C. players
Hartlepool United F.C. players
Northampton Town F.C. players
Crystal Palace F.C. players
Scunthorpe United F.C. managers
Association football defenders
Stockton F.C. players
English football managers